The badminton tournament at the 2003 Southeast Asian Games was held from December 6 to December 12 in Tan Binh Sport Center, Ho Chi Minh City of Vietnam.

Medalists

Final results

Results

Men's team

Quarter-final

Semi-final

Final

Women's team

Quarter-final

Semi-final

Final

Men's singles

Women's singles

Men's doubles

Women's doubles

Mixed doubles

Medal table
(Host nation in bold.)

References

Results
Results from SEA GAMES 2003 - VIETNAM - XXII.  SEA GAMES at Hanoi /  11.12.2003. The Star Online. Retrieved on 2016-02-19.
Results from SEA GAMES 2003 - VIETNAM - XXII.  SEA GAMES at Hanoi /  12.12.2003. The Star Online. Retrieved on 2016-02-19.
Results from SEA GAMES 2003 - VIETNAM - XXII.  SEA GAMES at Hanoi /  13.12.2003. The Star Online. Retrieved on 2016-02-23.

External links
2003 SEA Games Official Site: Badminton

2003 Southeast Asian Games
Southeast Asian Games
2003 Southeast Asian Games events
Badminton tournaments in Vietnam